"Get U're Dream" is the 32nd single by Japanese band Zard and released September 6, 2000 under the B-Gram Records label. The composer of Get U're Dream, Aika Ohno self-cover this single in her cover album Silent Passage.

The single opened at #4 the first week. It charted for eight weeks and sold over 241,000 copies.

Track list
All songs are written by Izumi Sakai and composed by Aika Ohno
Get U're Dream
arrangement: Takeshi Hayama
Michael Africk, Aika Ohno and Izumi Sakai participated in chorus part
the song was used in NHK's Sydney Olympics as theme song 
Get U're Dream (version 2)
arrangement: Akihito Tokunaga
compared to first version, this arrangement has rock feel
Get U're Dream (version 3)
arrangement: Yoko Blaqstone
Yoko Blaqstone fully participated in chorus part, this arrangement has r&b feel
Get U're Dream(original karaoke) 
Get U're Dream (Perry Geyer Short Mix)
remix: perry geyer
MIchael Africk fully participated in chorus part

References

2000 singles
Zard songs
Songs written by Izumi Sakai
Olympic theme songs
Songs written by Aika Ohno
2000 songs